Admiral Sir Frederick Charles Tudor Tudor,  (born Jones; 29 March 1863 – 14 April 1946) was a British Royal Navy officer who went on to be Third Sea Lord.

Early life and career
Tudor was born in Stoke Damerel, Devon, the son of Harrington Rogers Jones, of Harwich, and Henrietta Augusta Tudor, of Cork, Ireland. He came first in order of merit out of 42 candidates who passed the examination for naval cadetships in 1875. Jones was promoted to the rank of lieutenant with seniority of 29 March 1884. On 26 December 1890, he adopted his mother's maiden name and changed his surname to Tudor. His brother Henry Morton Tudor Tudor was also a Royal Navy admiral.

Tudor was promoted to the rank of commander on 31 December 1896. He was appointed an Assistant to the Director of Naval Ordnance from the same date.

After serving as Assistant Director of Naval Ordnance at the Admiralty from 1906 to 1909 he was given command of the Gunnery School at Whale Island in Portsmouth in 1910. He went on to be Director of Naval Ordnance and Torpedoes from 1912 to 1914.

He served in World War I as Third Sea Lord from 1914 to 1917 when he became Commander-in-Chief, China Station. Tudor was responsible for arranging the escape of refugees from Siberia through Japan and on to Canada. In 1917, he was awarded the Japanese Order of the Rising Sun, Gold and Silver Star, which represents the second highest of eight classes associated with the award.  Notice of the King's permission to accept and to display this honour was duly published in the London Gazette. Tudor later became President of the Royal Naval College, Greenwich in 1920 before retiring in 1922.

Tudor was an uncle of Owen Frederick Morton Tudor, who married Larissa Tudor, a woman some people have claimed might have really been Grand Duchess Tatiana Nikolaevna of Russia.

Notes

References
 Occleshaw, Michael, The Romanov Conspiracies: The Romanovs and the House of Windsor, Orion, 1993,

External links
 

|-

|-

1863 births
1946 deaths
Military personnel from Devon
Lords of the Admiralty
Royal Navy admirals of World War I
Knights Commander of the Order of St Michael and St George
Knights Commander of the Order of the Bath
Recipients of the Order of the Rising Sun, 2nd class
Admiral presidents of the Royal Naval College, Greenwich
Military personnel from Plymouth, Devon